Events from the year 1560 in Ireland.

Incumbent
Monarch: Elizabeth I

Events
January – Act of Supremacy (Ireland) Act passed.
Queen Elizabeth I of England and Ireland orders the Lord Lieutenant of Ireland, the Earl of Sussex, to appoint John Challoner of Dublin as the first Chief Secretary for Ireland "because at this present there is none appointed to be Clerk of our Council there, and considering how more meet it were, that in our realm there were for our honour one to be our Secretary there for the affairs of our Realm".

Births
Sir Valentine Blake, merchant (d. 1635)
Florence MacCarthy, The MacCarthy Mór, Prince of Carbery (d. 1640)
Fláithrí Ó Maol Chonaire, Franciscan (d. 1629)
Possible date – Constantine Ó Nialláin, soldier and Capuchin friar (d. after 1621)

Deaths
Luke Netterville, judge (b. c.1510)

References

 
1560s in Ireland
Ireland
Years of the 16th century in Ireland